Zafer Yelen (born 30 August 1986) is a Turkish footballer who plays for MSV Normannia 08.

Career

Club career
Yelen was born in Berlin, Germany. He played for various clubs in Berlin, most recently for Tennis Borussia Berlin in the Junior League East, where he was discovered by the former Hansa Rostock coach Frank Pagelsdorf. He then got Timo Lange, the coach of the league, to transfer him to FC Hansa. In the 2005–06 season, his first season in the adult area, Yelen scored 14 goals in 30 games for the second string Rostock team in the league. For the 2006–07 season, he advanced to the second division team where he was a regular player and his playmaking skills developed. He scored five goals in 26 starts and was promoted at the end of the season with Hansa Rostock to the Bundesliga.

Through his achievements in the second division he was also appointed to the Turkish national under-21 team and played on 7 February 2007 in his first game for them.

In the following 2007–08 Bundesliga season, Yelen completed 20 games for the Baltic city dwellers, but was immediately relegated to the second Bundesliga, whereupon Yelen initially sought a change in Turkey, which for lack of sufficient financial security did not come about. After the 2008–09 season with just two appearances for Hansa he tried again to force a change in Turkey. End of the season his contract was finally cancelled in Rostock, and Yelen moved to the Turkish first division side Trabzonspor.
In July 2011, Yelen joined second division club FSV Frankfurt.

International
He was a member of the Turkish U-21 national team. He played twice in 2008 Toulon Tournament and five times in the 2009 UEFA European Under-21 Football Championship qualification.

References

External links
 
 TFF Profile
 

1986 births
Living people
German footballers
Turkish footballers
Turkey under-21 international footballers
Tennis Borussia Berlin players
FC Hansa Rostock players
Trabzonspor footballers
German people of Turkish descent
Bundesliga players
2. Bundesliga players
Regionalliga players
Türkiyemspor Berlin players
Süper Lig players
Footballers from Berlin
Association football midfielders